This is a list of episodes of Gurren Lagann, a Japanese anime series produced by Gainax and directed by Hiroyuki Imaishi. The anime premiered on the TV Tokyo and other TXN stations on April 1, 2007 containing twenty-seven episodes. The English version began to air on Sci-Fi's Ani-Monday block, airing two episodes a week, starting July 28, 2008. The English version also began airing on Animax across its English-language networks in Southeast Asia and South Asia, starting on May 22, 2009. In Canada, it airs on Super Channel.

Each episode's title is derived from a line spoken by a specific character from the series: the titles from episodes 1 through 8 are spoken by Kamina, episodes 9 through 15 by Nia, the preview for episode 16 by Viral, episodes 17 through 22 by Rossiu, and episodes 23 through 27 by Simon. Note that not all translations for the episode titles are official.

Episodes

Gurren Lagann Parallel Works
In conjunction with the release of the movie, Gainax has released a series of music videos entitled Gurren Lagann Parallel Works which contains alternative stories of Gurren Lagann set to songs from the original soundtrack. The first series was released on June 15, 2008. A second series with seven videos, Parallel Works 2, was released on May 26, 2010.

Music videos

References

Tengen Toppa Gurren Lagann Official Story 

Gurren Lagann